The Marrku–Wurrugu languages are a possible language family of Australian Aboriginal languages spoken in the Cobourg Peninsula region of Western Arnhem Land.  They are Marrgu, with one remaining speaker as of 2011, and the extinct Wurrugu. They were once classified as distant relatives of the other Iwaidjan languages, until Nicholas Evans found the evidence for Marrgu's membership insufficient, concluding that similarities were due to borrowing (including of verbal paradigms).

The genetic grouping of Marrgu and Wurrugu is supported by the following observations:
 Despite being geographically separated by the Garig-Ilgar languages, the two languages share a relatively high cognacy rate (15 out of 43 words = ~35%).
 Both languages contain an interdental phoneme [dh], which is absent in the surrounding Iwaidjan languages.

Vocabulary
Capell (1942) lists the following basic vocabulary items:

{| class="wikitable sortable"
! gloss !! Mara !! Margu
|-
! man
| gärijimar || geiag
|-
! woman
| girija || njunɔn
|-
! head
| maraŋuɽu || waɽi
|-
! eye
| maguɽ || daːɭa
|-
! nose
| djiɽi || ɣïːni
|-
! mouth
| ŋaːndal || ŋaɽjad
|-
! tongue
| djiːjil || ŋaɽjad
|-
! stomach
| gunjan || ɣiwud
|-
! bone
| ŋajigad || aruwa
|-
! blood
| ŋulidji || didjaːridj
|-
! kangaroo
| girmọ || wïːdjud
|-
! opossum
| gudjaɳi || wiːɽiɽin
|-
! emu
| djiwiɖiwiɖi || mangunuba
|-
! crow
| waŋganaŋi || reimbiriri
|-
! fly
| guɳɖil || mɔlg
|-
! sun
| gunaru || muɽi
|-
! moon
| waɖaŋari || rana
|-
! fire
| waɖgar || djuːɳa
|-
! smoke
| guŋoŋo || ŋoɭan
|-
! water
| ŋọgọ || wobaidj
|}

References

 
Language families
Non-Pama-Nyungan languages
Indigenous Australian languages in the Northern Territory